Buddy Cannon (born April 20, 1947 Lexington, Tennessee) is an American country music songwriter and record producer. Active since the late 1970s, he is known primarily for his work with Willie Nelson and as Kenny Chesney's record producer, for which he won the Academy of Country Music's Producer of the Year award in 2006.

Along with Bill Anderson and Jamey Johnson, Cannon co-wrote George Strait's 2006 single "Give It Away", which won the Country Music Association's Song of the Year award. Other artists who have recorded Cannon's songs include Vern Gosdin, George Strait, Billy Ray Cyrus and Mel Tillis; artists whose albums he has produced also include Chely Wright, Reba McEntire, George Jones, Louise Mandrell and Willie Nelson and Merle Haggard. Cannon was also honored by the United States House of Representatives for his contributions as a record producer.

He is the father of singer Melonie Cannon and songwriter Marla Cannon-Goodman.

References

External links
Official website

American country singer-songwriters
American country record producers
Living people
People from Lexington, Tennessee
1947 births
Singer-songwriters from Tennessee
Country musicians from Tennessee
American male singer-songwriters